Gogrial West County is an administrative area in Warrap State, South Sudan.

References

Warrap (state)
Counties of South Sudan